The Department of Biology, established in 2022, is a science department in the University of Oxford's Mathematical, Physical and Life Sciences Division. It was formed on 1 August 2022 after a merger between the Department of Plant Sciences and Department of Zoology. 

The department has two main buildings: Department of Biology (Mansfield Road) and Department of Biology (South Parks Road). It also has an additional field station, The John Krebs Field Station, based in Wytham.

Overview 
The Department's research spans levels from molecules to ecosystems in order to address fundamental questions relating to food security, plant molecular biology, disease biology, evolutionary mechanisms, conservation biology, biodiversity, evolutionary developmental biology, climate change and animal behaviour. This department also delivers the teaching of a undergraduate MBiol degree in biology. Within its research portfolio, the department incorporates several research institutes such as the Edward Grey Institute of Field Ornithology (EGI), the Wildlife Conservation Research Unit (WildCRU); as well as housing the Oxford University Herbaria. Several members of academic staff work within the Peter Medawar Building for Pathogen Research and were involved in addressing the COVID-19 pandemic.

Additional partnerships and resources of the Department include the Oxford University Museum of Natural History, the Oxford Botanic Garden and Arboretum, the John Krebs Field Station and Wytham Woods.

Research themes 
Research at the Department of Biology is grouped into five broad and cross-cutting themes:

 Behaviour & Biomechanics
 Ecology & Conservation
 Evolutionary Biology
 Microbiology & Infectious Disease
 Molecular Plant Biology

Notable staff 
The following people of note are or have been associated with the Department:

 John Gurdon
 Richard Dawkins
 Charles Elton
 E S Goodrich
 Sunetra Gupta
 Bill Hamilton
 Sir Alistair Hardy
 Paul Harvey (Former Head of Department)
 Peter Holland (Former Head of Department)
 John Krebs
 David Lack
 Sir E Ray Lankester
 Bob May
 Angela McLean
 Desmond Morris
 E.J. Milner-Gulland (Former Head of Department)
 Chris Perrins
 John Pringle
 Ben Sheldon (Former Head of Department)
 Sir Richard Southwood
 Niko Tinbergen
 Liam Dolan
 Nicholas Harberd
 Jane A. Langdale
 Chris J. Leaver
 Steven A. Hill

History 
The Department of Biology was formed from the merging of the former Departments of Plant Sciences and Zoology on the 1 August 2022.

The former Department of Zoology, founded in 1860, was housed in the Tinbergen Building until it was demolished in Spring 2022. Designed in 1965 by Sir Leslie Martin (who also designed the Royal Festival Hall) and opened in 1971, the Tinbergen Building was a large Modernist building housing over 1,600 staff and students. It was Oxford University's largest building at the time. In February 2017, university officials announced that the Tinbergen Building would be closed for two years and all research and teaching activities of the Department would be moved elsewhere. This was due to the discovery of more asbestos than had been previously known; too much than could be removed during necessary maintenance with the building remaining occupied.

The former Department of Plant Sciences was formed from the Imperial Forestry Institute. The 'Imperial Forestry Institute' was formed from in 1924,; later it became the Commonwealth Forestry Institute from 1939. The Oxford Forestry Institute was incorporated and became the Department of Plant Sciences in 2002.

In January 2021, the Oxford City Council approved the £200m construction of the Life and Mind Building, which will be the university's largest building project and house the Departments of Experimental Psychology and Biology. It will replace the Tinbergen Building on South Parks Road. The building will feature multiple laboratories, teaching and testing spaces providing research facilities for 800 students and 1200 researchers. Work started in 2021, with the building expected to open in 2025.

External links 
Life and Mind Building website

References 

Departments of the University of Oxford
Research institutes in Oxford